The Digital Assets Repository ( or DAR) is a system developed at the Bibliotheca Alexandrina (BA) by the International School of Information Science (ISIS) to create and maintain digital library collections and preserve them to future generations.

The project's main goal is to build a digital resources repository by supporting the creation, use, and preservation of varieties of digital resources as well as the development of management tools. These tools help BA library to preserve, manage and share digital assets. The system is based on evolving standards for easy integration with web-based interoperable digital libraries.

DAR is designed to manage the full lifecycle of a digital asset: its creation and ingestion, its metadata management, storage and archival in addition to the necessary mechanisms for publishing and dissemination. In 2011, DAR system architecture was revamped and upgraded to its 3rd release in order to answer challenges that face an institution in consolidating its assets.

Access 
BA announced launching the largest Arabic digital library worldwide, maintained by DAR in April 2010 with 130,000 books. In 2011 and ongoing, the repository reached 185,000 Arabic books out of a 5-language collection of 300,000 books.

DAR provides free public access to the library's digitized collections through a web-based search and browsing facilities for Internet visitors directly via DAR's website. The site supports three languages interface: Arabic, English and French, and is listed at Egypt's Government Services Portal (Bawaba) website.

DAR website allows its online visitors to access full content of the public domain digitized books in the repository, but limits access to preview only (5%) snippet for the copyrighted digitized books with 10 pages minimum. Moreover, it provides different viewing options for repository contents, in addition to other tools such as: searching content; using annotation tools; adding sticky notes; tagging, rating and commenting on books; sharing books on social networks; and creating own virtual bookshelves per user.

See also 
 Institutional repository
 Internet Archive
 Islandora

Notes

References

Further reading 
 Arseneault, Michel. "Alexandria, from papyrus to the Internet." The UNESCO Courier 52, no. 4 (April 1999): 40-42.  and 
 Bilboul, Roger. "The Library of Alexandria Reopens." Information Today19, no. 11 (December 2002): 26.
 Watson, Bruce. "Rising Sun." Smithsonian, April 2002.

External links 
 Digital Assets Repository Official DAR website, BA
 DAR at the ISIS, BA
 DAR at the University of Texas

Egyptian digital libraries